"Cómo Duele El Silencio" ("How Silence Hurts") is a song recorded by Dominican-American singer Leslie Grace. it was released on May 18, 2015, by Sony Music Latin. The music video premiered on June 18, 2015, on the Telemundo news show Al Rojo Vivo. It was released online the next day. On September 18, 2015, she released a Banda version featuring Mexican-American singer Luis Coronel.

Charts

See also
List of number-one Billboard Tropical Songs of 2015

References 

2015 singles
2015 songs
Bachata songs
Spanish-language songs
Sony Music Latin singles